is a train station on the Minobu Line of Central Japan Railway Company (JR Central) located in the town of Ichikawamisato, Nishiyatsushiro District, Yamanashi Prefecture, Japan.

Lines
Kai-Ueno  Station is served by the Minobu Line and is located 72.8 kilometers from the southern terminus of the line at Fuji Station.

Layout
Kai-Ueno  Station has one island platform connected to the station building by a level crossing. The station is unattended.

Platforms

Adjacent stations

History
Kai-Ueno Station was opened on March 30, 1928 as a station on the Fuji-Minobu Line. The line came under control of the Japanese Government Railways on May 1, 1941.  The JGR became the JNR (Japan National Railway) after World War II. The station has been unattended since June 1983. Along with the division and privatization of JNR on April 1, 1987, the station came under the control and operation of the Central Japan Railway Company. A new station building was completed in February 2003.

Surrounding area
 Ueno Post Office
 Fuefuki River

See also
 List of railway stations in Japan

External links

   Minobu Line station information 

Railway stations in Japan opened in 1928
Railway stations in Yamanashi Prefecture
Minobu Line
Ichikawamisato, Yamanashi